Silane is an inorganic compound with chemical formula, .  It is a colourless, pyrophoric, toxic gas with a sharp, repulsive smell, somewhat similar to that of acetic acid. Silane is of practical interest as a precursor to elemental silicon. Silane with alkyl groups are effective water repellents for mineral surfaces such as concrete and masonry. Silanes with both organic and inorganic attachments are used as coupling agents.

Production

Commercial-scale routes
Silane can be produced by several routes. Typically, it arises from the reaction of hydrogen chloride with magnesium silicide:
 Mg2Si + 4 HCl -> 2 MgCl2 + SiH4

It is also prepared from metallurgical-grade silicon in a two-step process. First, silicon is treated with hydrogen chloride at about 300 °C to produce trichlorosilane, HSiCl3, along with hydrogen gas, according to the chemical equation
 Si + 3 HCl -> HSiCl3 + H2

The trichlorosilane is then converted to a mixture of silane and silicon tetrachloride:
 4 HSiCl3 -> SiH4 + 3 SiCl4
This redistribution reaction requires a catalyst.

The most commonly used catalysts for this process are metal halides, particularly aluminium chloride. This is referred to as a redistribution reaction, which is a double displacement involving the same central element. It may also be thought of as a disproportionation reaction, even though there is no change in the oxidation number for silicon (Si has a nominal oxidation number IV in all three species). However, the utility of the oxidation number concept for a covalent molecule, even a polar covalent molecule, is ambiguous.

An alternative industrial process for the preparation of very high-purity silane, suitable for use in the production of semiconductor-grade silicon, starts with metallurgical-grade silicon, hydrogen, and silicon tetrachloride and involves a complex series of redistribution reactions (producing byproducts that are recycled in the process) and distillations. The reactions are summarized below:

 Si + 2 H2 + 3 SiCl4 -> 4 SiHCl3
 2 SiHCl3 -> SiH2Cl2 + SiCl4
 2 SiH2Cl2 -> SiHCl3 + SiH3Cl
 2 SiH3Cl -> SiH4 + SiH2Cl2

The silane produced by this route can be thermally decomposed to produce high-purity silicon and hydrogen in a single pass.

Another commercial production of silane involves reduction of silicon dioxide under Al and  gas in a mixture of NaCl and aluminum chloride at high pressures:

 3 SiO2 + 6 H2 + 4 Al -> 3 SiH4 + 2 Al2O3

Laboratory-scale routes
In 1857, the German chemists Heinrich Buff and Friedrich Woehler discovered silane among the products formed by the action of hydrochloric acid on aluminum silicide, which they had previously prepared. They called the compound siliciuretted hydrogen.

For classroom demonstrations, silane can be produced by heating sand with magnesium powder to produce magnesium silicide, then pouring the mixture into hydrochloric acid. The magnesium silicide reacts with the acid to produce silane gas, which burns on contact with air and produces tiny explosions. This may be classified as a heterogeneous acid–base chemical reaction, since the isolated  ion in the  antifluorite structure can serve as a Brønsted–Lowry base capable of accepting four protons. It can be written as

 4 HCl + Mg2Si -> SiH4 + 2 MgCl2

In all cases, these substances react with Brønsted–Lowry acids to produce some type of hydride of silicon that is dependent on the Si anion connectivity in the silicide. The possible products include  and/or higher molecules in the homologous series , a polymeric silicon hydride, or a silicic acid. Hence,  with their zigzag chains of  anions (containing two lone pairs of electrons on each Si anion that can accept protons) yield the polymeric hydride .

Yet another small-scale route for the production of silane is from the action of sodium amalgam on dichlorosilane, to yield monosilane along with some yellow polymerized silicon hydride .

Properties
Silane is the silicon analogue of methane. Because of the greater electronegativity of hydrogen in comparison to silicon, this Si–H bond polarity is the opposite of that in the C–H bonds of methane. One consequence of this reversed polarity is the greater tendency of silane to form complexes with transition metals.  A second consequence is that silane is pyrophoric — it undergoes spontaneous combustion in air, without the need for external ignition. However, the difficulties in explaining the available (often contradictory) combustion data are ascribed to the fact that silane itself is stable and that the natural formation of larger silanes during production, as well as the sensitivity of combustion to impurities such as moisture and to the catalytic effects of container surfaces causes its pyrophoricity. Above 420 °C, silane decomposes into silicon and hydrogen; it can therefore be used in the chemical vapor deposition of silicon.

The Si–H bond strength is around 384 kJ/mol, which is about 20% weaker than the H–H bond in H2.  Consequently, compounds containing Si–H bonds are much more reactive than is H2. The strength of the Si–H bond is modestly affected by other substituents: the Si–H bond strengths are: SiHF3 419 kJ/mol, SiHCl3 382 kJ/mol, and SiHMe3 398 kJ/mol.

Applications

While diverse applications exist for organosilanes, silane itself has one dominant application, as a precursor to elemental silicon, particularly in the semiconductor industry. The higher silanes, such as di- and trisilane, are only of academic interest. About 300 metric tons per year of silane were consumed in the late 1990s. Low-cost solar photovoltaic module manufacturing has led to substantial consumption of silane for depositing (PECVD) hydrogenated amorphous silicon (a-Si:H) on glass and other substrates like metal and plastic. The PECVD process is relatively inefficient at materials utilization with approximately 85% of the silane being wasted. To reduce that waste and the ecological footprint of a-Si:H-based solar cells further several recycling efforts have been developed.

Safety and precautions
A number of fatal industrial accidents produced by combustion and detonation of leaked silane in air have been reported.

Due to weak bonds and hydrogen silane is a pyrophoric gas (capable of autoignition at temperatures below ).
SiH4 + 2 O2 -> SiO2 + 2 H2O

SiH4 + O2 -> SiO2 + 2 H2
SiH4 + O2 -> SiH2O + H2O
2 SiH4 + O2 -> 2 SiH2O + 2H2
SiH2O + O2 -> SiO2 + H2O

For lean mixtures a two-stage reaction process has been proposed, which consists of a silane consumption process and a hydrogen oxidation process. The heat of  condensation increases the burning velocity due to thermal feedback.

Diluted silane mixtures with inert gases such as nitrogen or argon are even more likely to ignite when leaked into open air, compared to pure silane: even a 1% mixture of silane in pure nitrogen easily ignites when exposed to air.

In Japan, in order to reduce the danger of silane for amorphous silicon solar cell manufacturing, several companies began to dilute silane with hydrogen gas. This resulted in a symbiotic benefit of making more stable solar photovoltaic cells as it reduced the Staebler–Wronski effect.

Unlike methane, silane is fairly toxic: the lethal concentration in air for rats (LC50) is 0.96% (9,600 ppm) over a 4-hour exposure. In addition, contact with eyes may form silicic acid with resultant irritation.

In regards to occupational exposure of silane to workers, the US National Institute for Occupational Safety and Health has set a recommended exposure limit of 5 ppm (7 mg/m3) over an eight-hour time-weighted average.

See also
Binary silicon-hydrogen compounds (sometimes called silanes)
Silanization
Magnesium silicide

References

Cited sources

External links
US Patent 2474087A, Preparation of silicon halides

Gases
Industrial gases
Silanes
Foul-smelling chemicals